Leila Al Mutawa (born in 1987 in Muharraq) is a Bahraini novelist and journalist. She is known for writing novels centering frankly on the female perspective in a society with strong fundamentalist elements.

Early life 
Born in Muharraq in 1987 to a devout family, she began reading avidly after receiving a library of masterpieces from her father upon his death, which was supplemented by her mother's book and magazine purchases. At the age of ten, she wrote an article about the danger of tobacco addiction, but was reluctant to become a writer. Moving alone at twenty to the United Arab Emirates, she met a friend whose story inspired the disastrous marriage in her debut novel, written starting in 2008 and published in 2012. Her debut novel was قلبي ليس للبيع (“My Heart Is Not for Sale”).

Career 
She participated in the International Prize for Arabic Fiction"Booker" workshop in 2016, and was chosen in 2019 to participate in the book "How many lungs for the coast " by the United Nations Educational, Scientific and Cultural Organization "UNESCO", and the book was published in 2020. She was a guest at the "Sharjah International Book" in 2020, and was chosen in 2021 to participate in the "Lyon Literature Festival".

Work
 قلبي ليس للبيع (“My Heart Is Not for Sale”).
 أحلام لا تموت (“Dreams Never Die”)

External links
 in Sayidaty
 Article in Akhbar Al Khaleej or Gulf News
 Archived article in the Saudi paper Okaz on the inspiration for debut novel
 Goodreads page

References

Bahraini feminists
Bahraini novelists
1987 births
Living people
People from Muharraq